Natalia Kostiantynivna Popovych (born 16 March 1968, in Gurzuf, Yalta municipality, Ukrainian SSR), is a Ukrainian politician. 

In 2014 she was appointed as the Presidential representative of Ukraine in Crimea that was shortly before that position was  transferred to Kherson due to the annexation of Crimea by the Russian Federation.

See also
 Artek (camp)

References

External links
 Fedorova, L. Interview with the Presidential representative of Ukraine in Crimea Natalia Popovych (Інтерв’ю з Постійним Представником Президента України в Автономній Республіці Крим Наталією Попович). Bizness-Yuzhnyi Region. 12 August 2014

1968 births
Living people
People from Yalta Municipality
People from the Crimean Oblast
People of the annexation of Crimea by the Russian Federation
Presidential representatives of Ukraine in Crimea
Ukrainian exiles of the annexation of Crimea by the Russian Federation